Stadio Ernesto Breda is a multi-use stadium in Sesto San Giovanni, Italy.  It is currently used for both football and American football matches and it's the home ground of S.S.D. Pro Sesto, Inter Milan Women and Inter Milan Primavera. The stadium holds 3,523 spectators.

References

Breda